Schildorn is a municipality in the district of Ried im Innkreis in the Austrian state of Upper Austria.

Geography
Schildorn lies in the Innviertel. About 18 percent of the municipality is forest, and 73 percent is farmland.

References

Cities and towns in Ried im Innkreis District